12BET (also known as 壹贰博) is an online gaming brand that specializes in providing Sports Betting and Casino products and services in multiple languages across European and Asia Pacific markets. 12BET is well-known brand in Asia while it ranking 17th globally according to eGaming Review Magazine's Annual Power 50Ranking.

History 
12BET, a brand that is run by Pacific Sea Invests, started its full operation in 2007. It is licensed and regulated by Cagayan Economic Zone Authority of the Philippine Government. First Cagayan Leisure and Resort Corporation also owns a remote UK license under PACIFIC SEA MARKETING INTERNATIONAL LTD, a British Virgin Islands company, managed and regulated by the Gambling Commission in Great Britain.

Sponsorship 
12BET started in 2007 and since then, they have a history of sponsoring sports events and various Football clubs as follows:

2022 

 Wolverhampton Wanderers F.C - 1-year-deal - Official Sleeve partner

2020 

 West Bromwich Albion FC - 2-year-deal - Official betting Partner

2019 

 Triton Poker Montenegro - 1-year-deal - Official Betting Partner
 All England Badminton Championships - 1-yeat -deal -  Official Betting Partner

2018 
 Table tennis team World cup – 1-year deal – Official Partner

2017 
 Taekwondo GP – 2-year deal – Official Partner
 Badminton World Championships – 1-year deal – Official Partner
 West Bromwich Albion F.C. – 1-year deal – Official Sleeve and Training Wear Partner
 World Cup of Pool – 1-year deal – Title Sponsor

2016 
 Leicester City F.C.- 1-year deal – Official Betting Partner
 Arsenal F.C. – 3 years deal – Official Betting Partner

2015 
 Swansea City F.C.– 1-year deal – Official Betting Partner

2014 
 Badminton All England Championships – 1-year deal – official partner 
 Hull City F.C. – 1-year deal – Front of shirt sponsor
 Coventry – 1-game deal (FA Cup V Arsenal) – Front of shirt sponsor

2013 
 Crystal Palace F.C. – 1-year deal – Stadium Sponsor

2011 
 Wigan Athletic F.C. – 3-year deal – Front of shirt sponsor

2010
 Snooker UK Championship – Title sponsor 
 World Open Snooker – Title sponsor 
 West Bromwich Albion F.C. – 1 season deal – Club Partner 
 Birmingham City F.C. – 1 season deal – Club Partner 
 Newcastle United F.C. – 2-year deal – Official Betting Partner

2009 
 Sevilla F.C. – 2-year deal – Front of shirt sponsor
 12BET Sponsored Sevilla F.C. as The Official Shirt Sponsors in 2009 for 2 years. Sevilla, is Spain’s oldest sporting club solely devoted to football.

Awards 
In the eGaming Review Magazine's Power Ranking, 12BET have moved up to 17th Best Online Gaming Operator in the world from their previous ranking of 28th because of its odds and coverage of world sporting events.

Controversy 

Shortly after signing a stadium sponsorship deal with Crystal Palace, talks about renaming Selhurst Park to 12BET Stadium spread and ignited different reactions from its supporters. However, Crystal Palace management appeased its fans by stating that the stadium's name will not be changed.

Following the 2016 Cheltenham Horse Racing festival, 12BET voided a large number of winning Cheltenham bets and closed the accounts of customers. 12BET argued that they had been subject to widespread bonus abuse by customers opening multiple accounts and claiming bonuses. However, after a furious response on social media, the bookie brand apologized and agreed to refund 75% of the affected customers. While ruling out a criminal investigation, the Isle of Man Constabulary continues to monitor allegations of withheld funds.

References 

Online gambling companies of the Isle of Man
British companies established in 2007
Gambling companies established in 2007